The Atlanta Glory was a women's professional basketball team in Atlanta, Georgia.  It was a member of the American Basketball League.  The Glory played its home games in Forbes Arena.

The team folded before the start of the abortive third ABL season in 1998.

Notable players for the Glory included their star and head coach, Teresa Edwards, as well as Saudia Roundtree and Katrina McClain Johnson.

The Atlanta Glory, owned by Dwight Martin, is also a 2012 expansion team of the Women's American Basketball Association.

References

 "Minnesota Lynx Announce New Assistant Coaches" at WNBA.com

American Basketball League (1996–1998) teams
Defunct basketball teams in the United States
Basketball teams established in 1996
Sports clubs disestablished in 1998
Sports teams in Atlanta
Basketball teams in Georgia (U.S. state)
Women's sports in Georgia (U.S. state)